"Nothing Gold Can Stay" is a short poem written by Robert Frost in 1923 and published in The Yale Review in October of that year.

It was later published in the collection New Hampshire (1923), which earned Frost the 1924 Pulitzer Prize for Poetry. The poem lapsed into public domain in 2019. New Hampshire also included Frost's poems "Fire and Ice" and "Stopping by Woods on a Snowy Evening".

Reception 
Alfred R. Ferguson wrote of the poem, "Perhaps no single poem more fully embodies the ambiguous balance between paradisiac good and the paradoxically more fruitful human good than 'Nothing Gold Can Stay,' a poem in which the metaphors of Eden and the Fall cohere with the idea of felix culpa."

John A. Rea wrote about the poem's "alliterative symmetry", citing as examples the second line's "hardest – hue – hold" and the seventh's "dawn – down – day"; he also points out how the "stressed vowel nuclei also contribute strongly to the structure of the poem" since the back round diphthongs bind the lines of the poem's first quatrain together while the front rising diphthongs do the same for the last four lines.

In 1984, William H. Pritchard called the poem's "perfectly limpid, toneless assertion" an example of Frost demonstrating how "his excellence extended also to the shortest of figures", and fitting Frost's "later definition of poetry as a momentary stay against confusion."

In 1993, George F. Bagby wrote the poem "projects a fairly comprehensive vision of experience" in a typical but "extraordinarily compressed" example of synecdoche that "moves from a detail of vegetable growth to the history of human failure and suffering."

Musical adaptations 

 "Nothing Gold Can Stay" by American composer William Thayer Ames, a choral setting of the poem.
 "Nothing Gold Can Stay" by American composer Cecil William Bentz, a choral setting of the poem in his opus, "Two Short Poems by Robert Frost."
 "Nothing Gold Can Stay" by American composer Steven Bryant, an instrumental chorale inspired by the poem.
 "Nothing Gold Can Stay" by American composer Stephen DeCesare, a chorale set to the poem's lyrics.
 "Nothing Gold" by American composer Alva Henderson, a solo for baritone accompanied by piano.
 "Nothing Gold Can Stay" by American composer Timothy P. Cooper, a choral setting of the poem.
 "Nothing Gold Can Stay" by American composer Christopher Kalstad, a choral setting of the poem
 "Nothing Gold Can Stay" by Canadian composer Kenley Kristofferson, a choral setting of the poem.
 "Nothing Gold Can Stay" by Canadian composer Nick Peros,  a vocalist setting of the poem.
 "Nothing Gold Can Stay" by American composer Lelia Molthrop Sadlier, a choral setting of the poem.
 "Nothing Gold Can Stay" by American composer Rick Sowash,  a choral setting of the poem.
 "Nothing Gold Can Stay" by American composer Pasquale J. Spino,   a vocalist setting of the poem.
 "Nothing Gold Can Stay" by American composer Ross Thomason, a choral setting of the poem.
 "Nothing Gold Can Stay" by American composer Matthew Weisher, a choral setting of the poem.
 "Nothing Gold Can Stay by Dutch composer Annemieke Lustenhouwer, a mixed 4-part choral setting of the poem.

In popular culture

 The poem is featured in the 1967 novel The Outsiders by S. E. Hinton and the 1983 film adaptation, recited aloud by the character Ponyboy to his friend Johnny. In a subsequent scene, Johnny quotes a stanza from the poem back to Ponyboy by means of a letter read after he passes away.
 Nothing Gold Can Stay is the name of the debut studio album by American pop-punk band New Found Glory, released on October 19, 1999.
 A Garfield comic strip published on October 20, 2002, featured the titular character reciting this poem, This was replaced in book collections and on-line edition. This was likely because the poem was under copyright at the time the cartoon was published (the poem lapsed into public domain in 2019).
 Two Japanese manga take their titles from the poem: "Don't Stay Gold" (a prequel to Saezuru Tori wa Habatakanai) by Yoneda Kou (drap, May 2008), and "Stay Gold" by hideyoshico (ongoing in Gateau magazine; first volume Shodensha, 2012).
 The title and part of the poem is featured in the book The Fault in Our Stars by John Green by Hazel after her boyfriend Augustus dies.
 In The Simpsons episode "Lisa's Belly," Bart says, "So dawn bros down to day. Nothing swole can stay."
 The song "Daydreamer" from Young the Giant's 2014 album "Mind over Matter" references the poem with the lyrics "When nothing in gold can stay."
 In the movie Point of No Return (1993), the tutor of Nina starts to teach her how to practice common manners by quote: ""Nature's first green is gold" means? It means that the first is best...that youth is better than old age."

References

1923 poems
Poetry by Robert Frost
Works originally published in American magazines
Works originally published in literary magazines
American poems